This is a list of 83 species in Sciapus, a genus of long-legged flies in the family Dolichopodidae.

Sciapus species

Sciapus aberrans Becker, 1918
Sciapus adana Grichanov & Negrobov, 2014
Sciapus adumbratus (Becker, 1902)
Sciapus albifrons (Meigen, 1830)
Sciapus albovittatus Strobl, 1909
Sciapus algirus Macquart, 1849
Sciapus arctus Becker, 1922
Sciapus basarukini Grichanov & Selivanova, 2022
Sciapus basilicus Meuffels & Grootaert, 1990
Sciapus bellus (Loew, 1873)
Sciapus calceolatus (Loew, 1859)
Sciapus canariensis Grichanov & Negrobov, 2014
Sciapus collucens (Walker, 1856)
†Sciapus combaluzieri Timon-David, 1944
Sciapus contristans (Wiedemann, 1817)
Sciapus corsicanus Grichanov & Negrobov, 2014
Sciapus costae (Mik, 1890)
Sciapus delicatus (Walker, 1849)
Sciapus discretus Parent, 1926
Sciapus dytei Negrobov, Maslova & Selivanova, 2012
Sciapus endrodyi Grichanov, 1997
 †Sciapus erasmius Meuffels & Grootaert, 1999
Sciapus euchromus (Loew, 1857)
Sciapus euzonus (Loew, 1859)
Sciapus evanidus Bezzi, 1898
Sciapus filipes (Loew, 1861)
Sciapus flavicinctus (Loew, 1857)
Sciapus flexicornis Parent, 1944
Sciapus frater (Parent, 1927)
Sciapus freidbergi Grichanov & Negrobov, 2014
Sciapus glaucescens (Loew, 1856)
Sciapus gracilipes (Loew, 1871)
Sciapus heteropygus Parent, 1926
Sciapus hirtiventris (De Meijere, 1924)
Sciapus holoxanthos Parent, 1926
Sciapus incognitus Negrobov & Shamshev, 1986
Sciapus iranicus Grichanov & Negrobov, 2014
Sciapus judaeus Parent, 1932
Sciapus laetus (Meigen, 1838)
Sciapus lesinensis (Mik, 1889)
Sciapus litoralis Grichanov & Negrobov, 2014
Sciapus lobipes (Meigen, 1824)
Sciapus longimanus Becker, 1907
Sciapus longitarsis Grichanov & Negrobov, 2014
Sciapus longulus (Fallén, 1823)
Sciapus maritimus Becker, 1918
Sciapus matilei Negrobov, 1973
Sciapus maurus Parent, 1930
Sciapus medvedevi Negrobov & Selivanova, 2009
Sciapus mitis Parent, 1925
Sciapus montium Becker, 1908
Sciapus nebraskaensis (Harmston & Rapp, 1968)
Sciapus negrobovi Naglis & Bartak, 2015
Sciapus nervosus (Lehmann, 1822)
Sciapus nigricornis (Loew, 1869)
Sciapus occidasiaticus Grichanov & Negrobov, 2014
Sciapus oldenbergi Parent, 1932
Sciapus opacus (Loew, 1866)
Sciapus pallens (Wiedemann, 1830)
Sciapus palmipes Collin, 1966
Sciapus paradoxus Negrobov & Shamshev, 1986
Sciapus paradoxus paradoxus Negrobov & Shamshev, 1986
Sciapus paradoxus sachalinensis Negrobov & Shamshev, 1986
Sciapus platypterus (Fabricius, 1805)
Sciapus polozhentsevi Negrobov, 1977
Sciapus pseudobellus Grichanov & Negrobov, 2014
Sciapus richterae Negrobov & Grichanov, 2010
Sciapus roderi Parent, 1929
 †Sciapus rottensis Statz, 1940 
Sciapus rutilus (Van Duzee, 1914)
Sciapus sibiricus Negrobov & Shamshev, 1986
Sciapus spiniger (Zetterstedt, 1859)
Sciapus spinosus Parent, 1929
Sciapus subvicinus Grichanov, 2007
Sciapus sylvaticus Becker, 1907
Sciapus talebii Kazerani & Grichanov in Kazerani, Khaghaninia, Talebi & Grichanov, 2015
Sciapus tener (Loew, 1862)
Sciapus tenuinervis (Loew, 1857)
Sciapus vanharteni Naglis & Bickel, 2017
Sciapus venetus Meuffels, 1977
Sciapus vicinus Parent, 1925
Sciapus vladimiri Grichanov & Negrobov, 2014
Sciapus wiedemanni (Fallen, 1823)
Sciapus zewoiensus Tang, Zhu & Yang, 2019
Sciapus zonatulus (Zetterstedt, 1843)

The following additional species are listed for the genus by online databases:
Sciapus ukrainensis Pollet, 2003 g

Unrecognised species:
Sciapus aequalis Becker, 1922
Sciapus clarus (Walker, 1857)
Sciapus derelictus (Walker, 1856)
Sciapus dialithus (Bigot, 1890)
Sciapus illiciens (Walker, 1856)
Sciapus leiopus (Doleschall, 1856) c g
Sciapus nitidus (Walker, 1852)
Sciapus palmetorum (Doleschall, 1858) c g
Sciapus pellucens (De Meijere, 1913) c g
Sciapus piger Becker, 1922
Sciapus posticus (Walker, 1857)
Sciapus subnotatus (Walker, 1857)
Sciapus tardus Becker, 1922
Sciapus viridicollis (Frey, 1917) c g

Synonyms:
Sciapus adhaerens Becker, 1922: c g Moved to Heteropsilopus
Sciapus aestimatus (Walker, 1859): c g Moved to Chrysosoma
Sciapus albifacies Parent, 1931: c g Moved to Amblypsilopus
Sciapus albimanus Becker, 1918: Synonym of Sciapus algirus Macquart, 1849
 †Sciapus amabilis Statz, 1940: Renamed to Sciapus erasmius Meuffels & Grootaert, 1999
Sciapus amplicaudatus (Lamb, 1922): c g Moved to Mascaromyia
Sciapus angelicus Parent, 1930: Synonym of Amblypsilopus unicinctus (Van Duzee, 1927)
Sciapus angustifrons Parent, 1929: c g Moved to Amblypsilopus
Sciapus antennatus Becker, 1922: Moved to Amblypsilopus
Sciapus arduus Parent, 1936: c g Moved to Chrysosoma
Sciapus auresi Vaillant, 1952: c g Var. of Sciapus euzonus (Loew, 1859)
Sciapus aurichalceus Becker, 1922: Moved to Amblypsilopus
Sciapus australensis (Schiner, 1868): c g Moved to Negrobovia
Sciapus badjavensis Dyte, 1975: c g Synonym of Amblypsilopus flavipes (De Meijere, 1910)
Sciapus barbipalpis Parent, 1937: c g Synonym of Amblypsilopus lenga (Curran, 1929)
Sciapus basilewskyi Vanschuytbroeck, 1960: c g Moved to Amblypsilopus
Sciapus bellimanus (Van Duzee, 1927): c g Moved to Amblypsilopus
Sciapus bicalcaratus Parent, 1933: c g Moved to Ethiosciapus
Sciapus bilobatus (Lamb, 1922): c g Moved to Ethiosciapus
Sciapus bilobus (Van Duzee, 1929): c g Moved to Amblypsilopus
Sciapus bipectinatus Parent, 1934: c g Moved to Amblypsilopus
Sciapus bredini Robinson, 1975: Moved to Amblypsilopus
Sciapus brevitarsis Parent, 1932: c g Synonym of Amblypsilopus flaviappendiculatus (De Meijere, 1910)
Sciapus brionii (Becker, 1918): c g Synonym of Sciapus glaucescens (Loew, 1856)
Sciapus californicus Steyskal, 1966: i Moved to Amblypsilopus
Sciapus capillimanus (Enderlein, 1912): c g Moved to Amblypsilopus
Sciapus carboneus Parent, 1932: c g Synonym of Krakatauia anthracoides (Van der Wulp, 1896)
Sciapus castus (Loew, 1866): Moved to Amblypsilopus
Sciapus cilicostatus (Van Duzee, 1927): c g Moved to Amblypsilopus
Sciapus cilipennis (Aldrich, 1901): c g Moved to Amblypsilopus
Sciapus coalescens Parent, 1934: c g Synonym of Bickeliolus haemorhoidalis (Becker, 1923)
Sciapus connexus (Walker, 1835): i Moved to Austrosciapus
Sciapus cuthbertsoni Parent, 1937: c g Moved to Amblypsilopus
Sciapus decoripes Robinson, 1975: Moved to Amblypsilopus
Sciapus delectabilis Parent, 1932: c g Moved to Amblypsilopus
Sciapus difficilis (Parent, 1932): c g Moved to Narrabeenia
Sciapus digitatus Van Duzee, 1914: c g Synonym of Condylostylus quadricolor (Walker, 1849)
Sciapus dimidiatus (Loew, 1862): Moved to Amblypsilopus
Sciapus dolichoenemis (Frey, 1925): c g Synonym of Amblypsilopus flaviappendiculatus (De Meijere, 1910)
Sciapus duplicatus Parent, 1932: c g Moved to Mascaromyia
Sciapus elegans (Walker, 1852): Moved to Amblypsilopus
Sciapus ellisi Hollis, 1964: c g Moved to Amblypsilopus
Sciapus eutarsus Schiner, 1860: Synonym of Sciapus euzonus (Loew, 1859)
Sciapus evulgatus Becker, 1922: Moved to Krakatauia
Sciapus exarmatus Parent, 1933: c g Moved to Ethiosciapus
Sciapus eximius (Costa, 1886): Renamed to Sciapus costae (Mik, 1890)
Sciapus exul (Parent, 1932): c g Moved to Amblypsilopus
Sciapus filitarsis Parent, 1935: c g Moved to Amblypsilopus
Sciapus flabellifer Becker, 1923: Moved to Amblypsilopus
Sciapus flagellaris (Frey, 1925): c g Moved to Amblypsilopus
Sciapus flaviannulatus (Van Duzee, 1929): c g Synonym of Amblypsilopus unicinctus (Van Duzee, 1927)
Sciapus flaviappendiculatus (De Meijere, 1910): c g Moved to Amblypsilopus
Sciapus flavicornis (Aldrich, 1896): c g Moved to Amblypsilopus
Sciapus flavidus (Aldrich, 1896): c g Moved to Amblypsilopus
Sciapus flavipes (De Meijere, 1910): c g Moved to Amblypsilopus
Sciapus flaviventris Bezzi, 1905: Synonym of Ethiosciapus flavirostris (Loew, 1858)
Sciapus flavomaculatus Ringdahl, 1949: Synonym of Sciapus maritimus Becker, 1918
Sciapus flexus Loew, 1869
 Synonym of Sciapus contristans (Wiedemann, 1817)
Sciapus floridanus Harmston, 1971: i Moved to Amblypsilopus
Sciapus fruticosus Becker, 1922: Moved to Amblypsilopus
Sciapus fulgens von Roser, 1840: Synonym of Sciapus laetus (Meigen, 1838)
Sciapus fuscinervis (Van Duzee, 1926): i Moved to Amblypsilopus
Sciapus gemmatus (Walker, 1849): c g Moved to Parentia
Sciapus gilvipes (Enderlein, 1912): c Moved to Amblypsilopus
Sciapus grandicaudatus (Lamb, 1922): c g Moved to Mascaromyia
Sciapus gratiosus Becker, 1922: Synonym of Austrosciapus connexus (Walker, 1835)
Sciapus gravipes Becker, 1922: Moved to Amblypsilopus
Sciapus haemorhoidalis Becker, 1923: Moved to Bickeliolus
Sciapus inaequalis (Van Duzee, 1927): c g Moved to Amblypsilopus
Sciapus indistinctus (Lamb, 1922): c g Moved to Mascaromyia
Sciapus infans Becker, 1922: Moved to Amblypsilopus
Sciapus inflexus Becker, 1923: Moved to Ethiosciapus
Sciapus infumatus (Aldrich, 1901): i Moved to Amblypsilopus
Sciapus ingruo (Harris, 1780): c g Synonym of Sciapus platypterus (Fabricius, 1805)
Sciapus innoxius Parent, 1934: Synonym of Amblypsilopus cilipennis (Aldrich, 1901)
Sciapus integer Becker, 1923: Moved to Ethiosciapus
Sciapus interdictus Becker, 1922: Moved to Amblypsilopus
Sciapus lamellatus Parent, 1935: c g Moved to Bickeliolus
Sciapus latifacies (Van Duzee, 1934): c Moved to Amblypsilopus
Sciapus latilamellatus Parent, 1934: c g Moved to Amblypsilopus
Sciapus latitarsis Becker, 1922: Moved to Condylostylus
Sciapus lectus Becker, 1922: Synonym of Austrosciapus discretifasciatus (Macquart, 1849)
Sciapus lenga Curran, 1929: Moved to Amblypsilopus
Sciapus longipes (Van Duzee, 1929): c g Moved to Amblypsilopus
Sciapus luteus Robinson, 1975: Moved to Amblypsilopus
Sciapus macrodactylus Becker, 1918: Synonym of Sciapus evanidus Bezzi, 1898
Sciapus macula (Wiedemann, 1830): Moved to Amblypsilopus
Sciapus magnicaudatus (Lamb, 1922): c g Moved to Mascaromyia
Sciapus mauritiensis Parent, 1939: c g Moved to Mascaromyia
Sciapus medianus (Becker, 1922): c g Moved to Amblypsilopus
Sciapus mediterraneus Bulli & Negrobov, 1987: c g Renamed to Sciapus subvicinus Grichanov, 2007
Sciapus mexicanus (Aldrich, 1901): c g Moved to Amblypsilopus
Sciapus mutatus Becker, 1922: g Moved to Amblypsilopus
Sciapus nanus Parent, 1929: c g Moved to Amblypsilopus
Sciapus neoparvus Dyte, 1975: c g Moved to Amblypsilopus
Sciapus nigrimanus Van Duzee, 1914: c g Moved to Amblypsilopus
Sciapus nitidifacies Parent, 1934: c g Moved to Krakatauia
Sciapus noditarsis Becker, 1922: Moved to Amblypsilopus
Sciapus nubilipennis (Van Duzee, 1927): c g Synonym of Amblypsilopus macula (Wiedemann, 1830)
Sciapus occultus (Santos Abreu, 1929): c g Var. of Sciapus glaucescens (Loew, 1856)
Sciapus oldroydi Haider, 1957: c g Moved to Amblypsilopus (unrecognised)
Sciapus oscillans Parent, 1935: c g Moved to Amblypsilopus
Sciapus paracarboneus Hollis, 1964: c g Moved to Krakatauia
Sciapus parrai Milward de Azevedo, 1985: c g Moved to Amblypsilopus
Sciapus parvus Van Duzee, 1933: c g Moved to Amblypsilopus
Sciapus pectinatus (De Meijere, 1910): c g Moved to Amblypsilopus
Sciapus pectoralis Van Duzee, 1931: Synonym of Amblypsilopus parvus (Van Duzee, 1933)
Sciapus pediformis Becker, 1922: Moved to Amblypsilopus
Sciapus penicillatus Becker, 1922: Moved to Amblypsilopus
Sciapus peringueyi Curran, 1926: Synonym of Amblypsilopus rosaceus (Wiedemann, 1824)
Sciapus planipes (Van Duzee, 1929): c g Moved to Amblypsilopus
Sciapus pollicifer (Lamb, 1922): c g Moved to Mascaromyia
Sciapus pollinosus Van Duzee, 1915: i Moved to Amblypsilopus
Sciapus praecipuus Milward de Azevedo, 1985: c g Moved to Amblypsilopus
Sciapus pressipes Parent, 1929: i Synonym of Krakatauia evulgata (Becker, 1922)
Sciapus prolectans (Walker, 1856): Moved to Chrysosoma (unrecognised)
Sciapus pruinosus Coquillett, 1904: i Moved to Condylostylus
Sciapus psittacinus (Loew, 1861): i Moved to Amblypsilopus
Sciapus rectus (Wiedemann, 1830): Moved to Krakatauia
Sciapus rectangularis Parent, 1937: c g Moved to Amblypsilopus
Sciapus renschi Parent, 1932: c g Moved to Amblypsilopus
Sciapus restrictus (Hutton, 1901): c g Moved to Parentia
Sciapus rezendei Milward de Azevedo, 1985: c g Moved to Amblypsilopus
Sciapus rosaceus (Wiedemann, 1824): c g Moved to Amblypsilopus
Sciapus rotundiceps (Aldrich, 1904): i Moved to Amblypsilopus
Sciapus sachalinensis Negrobov & Shamshev, 1986: c g Subspecies of Sciapus paradoxus Negrobov & Shamshev, 1986
Sciapus scintillans (Loew, 1861): i Moved to Amblypsilopus
Sciapus sericeus (De Meijere, 1913): c g Moved to Krakatauia
Sciapus setifrons Parent, 1937: c g Synonym of Ethiosciapus bicalcaratus (Parent, 1933)
Sciapus sordidus (Parent, 1928): c g Moved to Dytomyia
Sciapus spinimanus (Van Duzee, 1927): c g Synonym of Amblypsilopus bellimanus (Van Duzee, 1927)
Sciapus striaticollis Becker, 1922: Moved to Amblypsilopus
Sciapus stuckenbergi Vanschuytbroeck, 1957: c g  Moved to Amblypsilopus
Sciapus subfascipennis Curran, 1926: Moved to Amblypsilopus
Sciapus subtilis Becker, 1924: Moved to Amblypsilopus
Sciapus sudanensis Parent, 1939: c g Moved to Amblypsilopus
Sciapus svenhedini Parent, 1936: c g Moved to Amblypsilopus
Sciapus tabulina Becker, 1922: Moved to Krakatauia
Sciapus tenuicauda Parent, 1936: c g Moved to Amblypsilopus
Sciapus trahens (Frey, 1925): c g Moved to Amblypsilopus
Sciapus trisetosus Van Duzee, 1932: i g Synonym of Condylostylus scaber (Loew, 1861)
Sciapus tropicalis Parent, 1933: c g Moved to Amblypsilopus
Sciapus turbidus Becker, 1922: Moved to Amblypsilopus
Sciapus unicoiensis Robinson, 1964: i Moved to Amblypsilopus
Sciapus unifasciatus (Say, 1823): i Moved to Amblypsilopus
Sciapus unitus Parent, 1928: Synonym of Krakatauia recta (Wiedemann, 1830)
Sciapus vagabundus Bezzi & Lamb, 1926 c g Moved to Mascaromyia
Sciapus variabilis (De Meijere, 1913): c g Moved to Amblypsilopus
Sciapus variegatus (Loew, 1861): i Moved to Amblypsilopus
Sciapus vialis (Raddatz, 1873): c g Synonym of Sciapus contristans (Wiedemann, 1817)
Sciapus villeneuvei Parent, 1927: Renamed to Amblypsilopus josephi Meuffels & Grootaert, 1999
Sciapus viridivittatus (Robinson, 1960): i Synonym of Amblypsilopus dorsalis (Loew, 1866)
Sciapus zucchii Milward de Azevedo, 1885: c g Moved to Amblypsilopus

The following species are listed for the genus by online databases, but are actually placed in Krakatauia:
Sciapus alanae Bickel, 1994 c g
Sciapus barbescens (Parent, 1939) c g
Sciapus claudiensis Bickel, 1994 c g
Sciapus macalpinei Bickel, 1994 c g
Sciapus malanda Bickel, 1994 c g
Sciapus micronesiana Bickel, 1994 c g
Sciapus nupta (Bezzi, 1928) c g
Sciapus obversicornis Bickel, 1994 c g
Sciapus pseudofuneralis Bickel, 1994 c g
Sciapus remota Bickel, 1994 c g
Sciapus trustorum Bickel, 1994 c g

Data sources: i = ITIS, c = Catalogue of Life, g = GBIF, b = Bugguide.net

References

Sciapus